The Beemster-class was a class of fourteen minesweepers that were built at different shipyards in the United States for the Royal Netherlands Navy (RNN). The minesweepers were based on the AMS-60 design and paid for by the United States under the Mutual Defense Assistance Program (MDAP). The minesweepers served in the RNN between 1953 and 1976.

Design and construction
The fourteen Beemster-class minesweepers were ordered in 1951 in the United States. They were based on the AMS-60 design. The first ships were taken into service of the Royal Netherlands Navy in 1953 and the last in 1954.

As built the ships were equipped with a W Mk 3 mod 1 mechanical sweep and either a A X Mk 6B or A X Mk 4V acoustic sweeper. Furthermore, it had a double machine gun of 20 mm. Later, in the 1960s and 1970s, the ships got equipped with a MB 5 magnetic sweeper.

Ships in class
The ships were named after the smaller Dutch municipalities that started with the letter B.

Notes

Citations

References

Mine warfare vessel classes
Minesweepers of the Royal Netherlands Navy